USS Heron (MHC-52) is the second ship of .

Heron was transferred to the Hellenic Navy under a foreign military sales agreement on 16 March 2007. Heron was renamed Kalipso.

References

https://www.hellenicnavy.gr/en/fleet/minehunters/hs-kalipso.html

 

Osprey-class coastal minehunters
Ships built in Savannah, Georgia
1992 ships
Ships transferred from the United States Navy to the Hellenic Navy
Kalypso
Mine warfare vessels of Greece